5 Canadian Mechanized Brigade Group (5 CMBG) is a Canadian Forces brigade group that is part of 2nd Canadian Division of the Canadian Army. It is based at CFB Valcartier, near Quebec City, Quebec. The brigade group is the formation responsible for the majority of francophone units of the regular army.

Units

Two regular force units of other formations (430 Tactical Helicopter Squadron and 5 Field Ambulance of Canadian Forces Medical Group) are collocated with 5 CMBG at CFB Valcartier and work closely with the brigade group, but are not officially a part of it.

History
During the 1970s and 1980s, the 5th was a Canadian Brigade Group (then called the 5e Groupe-brigade du Canada) was the primary formation of the Canadian Air-Sea Transportable Brigade Group (CAST), supported by additional artillery and light armour units, as well as two squadrons of Canadair CF-5 aircraft. The CAST mission to reinforce Norway in the event of hostilities was disbanded in 1989.  On June 5, 1987 a new Canadian defence policy called Challenge and Commitment was tabled by the Government that directed that the Canadian Forces in Europe consolidate effort by combining the standing brigade then in Germany 4 Canadian Mechanized Brigade Group with a rapidly deployable brigade from Canada.  The 5 Canadian Mechanized Brigade Group would serve in this role and join the 4 Canadian Mechanized Brigade Group under a newly created 1st Canadian Infantry Division tasked to the NATO Central Army Group until the end of the Cold War.

References

See also

 Military history of Canada
 History of the Canadian Army
 Canadian Forces
 List of armouries in Canada

Canadian Mechanized Brigade Groups